The 2017 United Kingdom general election in Wales was held on 8 June 2017; all 40 seats in Wales were contested. The election for each seat was conducted on the basis of first-past-the-post.

Despite the Labour party winning the most votes in Wales, the Conservatives won across the UK.

Results summary

Analysis
The Labour Party remained the largest party in Wales and won an even larger majority of seats after gaining three seats from the Conservatives. Its 48.9% of the vote and total of 771,354 popular votes were its best in Wales since 1997.

The Conservative Party, who entered the campaign with high hopes of making gains, saw its representation reduced back to the levels it won in the 2010 general election.

Plaid Cymru won back Ceredigion after the constituency's 12 years in Liberal Democrat hands, and brought its tally up to four seats, which was its best result showing since 2001 and one of its joint best in history.

Plaid Cymru's gain in Ceredigion and the Liberal Democrats' failure to make gains elsewhere meant that this was the first time in Welsh electoral history where there were no Liberal or Liberal Democrat MPs elected to represent a Welsh constituency in a Westminster Parliamentary election.

Target seats

Labour
Gower, Conservative, 0.1% (Labour Gain)
Vale of Clwyd, Conservative, 0.7% (Labour Gain)
Cardiff North, Conservative, 4.2% (Labour Gain)

Conservative
Bridgend, Labour, 4.9% (Labour Hold) 
Wrexham, Labour, 5.6% (Labour Hold) 
Clwyd South, Labour, 6.9% (Labour Hold) 
Delyn, Labour, 7.8% (Labour Hold) 
Alyn and Deeside, Labour, 8.1% (Labour Hold) 
Newport West, Labour, 8.7% (Labour Hold)

Plaid Cymru
Ynys Môn, Labour, 0.7% (Labour Hold)
Ceredigion, Liberal Democrats, 8.2% (Plaid Gain)

Opinion polling

See also 
 2017 United Kingdom general election in England
 2017 United Kingdom general election in Northern Ireland
 2017 United Kingdom general election in Scotland

Notes

References

2017 in Wales
2010s elections in Wales
Wales
2017